I'm in You is the fifth studio album by Peter Frampton. It was released on 28 May 1977, almost a year and a half after his blockbuster 1976 live album Frampton Comes Alive! It was recorded at Electric Lady Studios in New York, where Frampton's Camel had been recorded four years earlier.

Guest musicians Stevie Wonder, Richie Hayward, Mike Finnigan, and Mick Jagger are featured on this album.

I'm in You became Frampton's most commercially successful studio album; it rose to the No. 2 slot in the US on the Billboard 200 and was certified platinum, while in Canada, the album entered the chart directly at #1. The title track became his most successful single yet, reaching No. 2 on the Billboard Hot 100. On the Cash Box singles chart, "I'm in You" reached No. 1, as it also did in Canada.

Record World said of the single "Tried to Love" that "A loping rhythm and blues with signature instrumental effects will likely be Frampton's third straight single success from I'm In You" and that "The rhythm is engaging."  However, "Tried to Love" only reached #41 on the Billboard Hot 100.

Track listing
All tracks composed by Peter Frampton; except where indicated:

 "I'm in You" – 4:10
 "(Putting My) Heart on the Line" – 3:42
 "St. Thomas (Don't You Know How I Feel)" – 4:15
 "Won't You Be My Friend" – 8:10
 "You Don't Have to Worry" – 5:16
 "Tried to Love" – 4:27
 "Rocky's Hot Club" – 3:25
 "(I'm a) Road Runner" – 3:40 (Brian Holland, Lamont Dozier, Edward Holland, Jr.)
 "Signed, Sealed, Delivered (I'm Yours)" – 3:54 (Lee Garrett, Lula Mae Hardaway, Stevie Wonder, Syreeta Wright)

Personnel
Peter Frampton – electric guitars, acoustic guitars, slide guitar, bass guitar, piano, organ, Moog synthesizer, mini-Moog, ARP String Synthesizer, ARP Axxe, clavinet, harmonica, drums, percussion, vocals, talk box
Bob Mayo – organ, Hammond B-3, synthesizer, Moog synthesizer, ARP String Synthesizer, ARP Axxe, clavinet, melodica, electric piano, piano, Fender Rhodes, accordion, guitar, acoustic guitar, backing vocals
Stevie Wonder – harmonica on "Rocky's Hot Club"
Mick Jagger – backing vocals on "I'm in You", "Tried to Love" and "Signed, Sealed, Delivered (I'm Yours)"
Mike Finnigan – backing vocals on "Signed, Sealed, Delivered (I'm Yours)"
Stanley Sheldon – bass guitar, backing vocals
John Siomos – drums, percussion, tambourine
Richie Hayward – drums, percussion, congas on "St. Thomas (Don't You Know How I Feel)", "Won't You Be My Friend" and "Tried To Love"

Production
Prouducers: Peter Frampton, Chris Kimsey, Bob Mayo, Frankie D'Augusta
Engineers: Peter Frampton, Chris Kimsey, Bob Mayo, Frankie D'Augusta
Mixing: Peter Frampton, Chris Kimsey, Bob Mayo, Frankie D'Augusta
Mastering: George Marino, Doug Sax, Arnie Acosta
Art Direction: Vartan, Roland Young, Ryan Rogers
Photography: Neal Preston, Irving Penn
Supervisor: Beth Stempel, Bill Levenson
Coordinator: Beth Stempel, Bill Levenson
Management: Dee Anthony

Chart positions

Weekly charts

Year-end charts

Certifications

References

Peter Frampton albums
1977 albums
Albums produced by Chris Kimsey
Albums recorded at Electric Lady Studios
A&M Records albums
Albums produced by Peter Frampton